Harmony, New Jersey may refer to:
Harmony Township, New Jersey
Harmony, Monmouth County, New Jersey
Harmony, Ocean County, New Jersey
Harmony, Salem County, New Jersey